John Kenneth Dobb (November 15, 1901 – July 31, 1991), nicknamed "Lefty", was a pitcher in Major League Baseball. He played for the Chicago White Sox in 1924.

References

External links

1901 births
1991 deaths
Major League Baseball pitchers
Chicago White Sox players
Baseball players from Michigan
Sportspeople from Muskegon, Michigan
Central Michigan Chippewas baseball players